Dangjin Power Station is a large coal-fired power station in Dangjin, South Korea, owned by Korea East-West Power, part of Korea Electric Power Corporation. Third largest in the world the plant is estimated to have been the coal-fired power plant which emitted the third most carbon dioxide in 2018, at 34 million tons, and relative emissions are estimated at 1.5 kg per kWh. The government asked the company to voluntary cut coal-fired generation in 2021, which they did. Waste water is used for fish farming.

See also 
 List of coal power stations

References 

Coal-fired power stations in South Korea